Haavakannu is a village in Kuusalu Parish, Harju County in northern Estonia.

Ethnobotanist Gustav Vilbaste (1885–1967) was born in Haavakannu.

References

Villages in Harju County